Muíños is a municipality in the Spanish province of Ourense. It has a population of 1572 as of 2016 and an area of 110 km².

References  

Municipalities in the Province of Ourense